Viaplay is a streaming service owned by Viaplay Group which is based in Stockholm.

History 

Originally owned by Modern Times Group, it was launched in May 2007 as Viasat On Demand. It was rebranded as Viaplay in 2011. Viaplay released its first original fiction title, Swedish Dicks, in 2016.
As of 2021, it was available in Sweden, Norway, Finland, Denmark, Estonia, Latvia, Lithuania, Iceland and Poland. Capitalizing on the popularity of Nordic noir titles, the service rolled out plans to expand to Ireland, the UK and the Netherlands in November 2022, and Canada, Germany, Switzerland, Austria and the United States by 2023. Viaplay launched in the United States ahead of the previously planned schedule, initially exclusively to Comcast customers, with the intention to launch a direct-to-consumer platform later.

As the mother company Viaplay Group holds extensive sports rights in multiple markets, Viaplay provides sports broadcasts in most countries where it operates.

In May 2022, Viaplay announced the organisation had added the National Hockey League and Poland-based MMA promotion KSW to its UK offering. In July 2022, Viaplay Group acquired U.K.-based pay TV channel operator, Premier Sports, and rebranded it under the Viaplay name by 1st November 2022.

Launch

Notes

References

External links
 
 

Subscription video on demand services
Internet properties established in 2007
2007 establishments in Sweden